Teh is a common typographical error and internet slang neologism.

Teh may also refer to:

 The Indonesian, Malay, Javanese, Sunda, and Minangkabau word for tea.
 The drink Teh Tarik
 A variant of the Chinese surname Zheng (Chinese: 鄭/郑) common in Singapore and Malaysia.
 Huang Sian Teh (born 1919), Taiwanese martial artist
 Teh Cheang Wan (1928–1986), Singaporean architect
 Teh Hong Piow (born 1930), Chairman of Public Bank Berhad in Malaysia
 Teh Kew San (born 1934), former Malaysian badminton player
 Teh, a somewhat old-fashioned spelling of the Chinese phoneme now represented by Wade–Giles te or pinyin de, most commonly De (Chinese)
 Trans Europe Halles, European network of independent cultural centres
 ISO 639-3 code for the Tehuelche language of Patagonia
 Tehran, capital of Iran
Tellurol (TeH), analogues of alcohols (-OH) where tellurium replaces oxygen.

See also
 Dzu-Teh
 Lien-teh
 Ming-teh
 Teh-hui